1,1,1,2-Tetrafluoroethane (also known as norflurane (INN), R-134a, Freon 134a, Forane 134a, Genetron 134a, Green Gas, Florasol 134a, Suva 134a, or HFC-134a) is a hydrofluorocarbon (HFC) and haloalkane refrigerant with thermodynamic properties similar to R-12 (dichlorodifluoromethane) but with insignificant ozone depletion potential and a lower 100-year global warming potential (1,430, compared to R-12's GWP of 10,900). It has the formula CFCHF and a boiling point of −26.3 °C (−15.34 °F) at atmospheric pressure.  R-134a cylinders are colored light blue.  A phaseout and transition to HFO-1234yf and other refrigerants, with GWPs similar to CO2, began in 2012 within the automotive market.

Synthesis

Uses 
1,1,1,2-Tetrafluoroethane is a non-flammable gas used primarily as a "high-temperature" refrigerant for domestic refrigeration and automobile air conditioners.  These devices began using 1,1,1,2-tetrafluoroethane in the early 1990s as a replacement for the more environmentally harmful R-12.  Retrofit kits are available to convert units that were originally R-12-equipped.

Other common uses include plastic foam blowing, as a cleaning solvent, a propellant for the delivery of pharmaceuticals (e.g. bronchodilators), wine cork removers, gas dusters ("canned air"), and in air driers for removing the moisture from compressed air.  1,1,1,2-Tetrafluoroethane has also been used to cool computers in some overclocking attempts. It is the refrigerant used in plumbing pipe freeze kits. It is also commonly used as a propellant for airsoft airguns. The gas is often mixed with a silicone-based lubricant.

Aspirational and niche applications
1,1,1,2-Tetrafluoroethane is also being considered as an organic solvent, both in liquid and supercritical fluid.

It is used in the resistive plate chamber particle detectors in the Large Hadron Collider. It is also used for other types of particle detectors, e.g. some cryogenic particle detectors. It can be used as an alternative to sulfur hexafluoride in magnesium smelting as a shielding gas.

History and environmental impacts 
1,1,1,2-Tetrafluoroethane was introduced in the early 1990s as a replacement for dichlorodifluoromethane (R-12), which has massive ozone depleting properties. Even though 1,1,1,2-Tetrafluoroethane has insignificant ozone depletion potential (ozone layer) and negligible acidification potential (acid rain), it has a 100-year global warming potential (GWP) of 1430 and an approximate atmospheric lifetime of 14 years. Its concentration in the atmosphere and contribution to radiative forcing have been growing since its introduction. Thus it was included in the IPCC list of greenhouse gases.

R-134a was consequently banned from use in the European Union, starting with new cars in 2011, by a directive of 2006 banning gases in air conditioning systems with a GWP above 100.  

1,1,1,2-tetrafluoroethane is subject to use restrictions in the US and other countries as well. The Society of Automotive Engineers (SAE) has proposed that it be best replaced by a new fluorochemical refrigerant HFO-1234yf (CFCF=CH) in automobile air-conditioning systems. By model year 2021, newly manufactured light-duty vehicles in the United States will no longer use R-134a.

California may also prohibit the sale of canned R-134a to individuals to avoid non-professional recharge of air conditioners. A ban had been in place in Wisconsin since October 1994 under ATCP 136 prohibiting sales of container sizes holding less than 15 lbs of 1,1,1,2-tetrafluoroethane, but this restriction applied only when the chemical was intended to be a refrigerant. However, the ban was lifted in Wisconsin in 2012. During the time that it was active, this Wisconsin-specific ban contained loopholes.  For example, it was legal for a person to purchase gas duster containers with any amount of the chemical because in that instance the chemical is neither intended to be a refrigerant nor is HFC-134a included in the § 7671a listing of class I and class II substances.

Production and reactions
Tetrafluoroethane is typically made by reacting trichloroethylene with hydrogen fluoride:
CHCl=CCl + 4 HF → CFCHF + 3 HCl

It reacts with butyllithium to give trifluorovinyl lithium:
CFCHF + 2 BuLi → CF=CFLi + LiF  +  2 BuH

Safety 

Mixtures with air of the gas 1,1,1,2-tetrafluoroethane are not flammable at atmospheric pressure and temperatures up to 100 °C (212 °F). However, mixtures with high concentrations of air at elevated pressure and/or temperature can be ignited. Its gaseous form is denser than air and will displace air in the lungs. This can result in asphyxiation if excessively inhaled. This contributes to most deaths by inhalant abuse.

Aerosol cans containing 1,1,1,2-tetrafluoroethane, when inverted, become effective freeze sprays. Under pressure, 1,1,1,2-tetrafluoroethane is compressed into a liquid, which upon vaporization absorbs a significant amount of thermal energy. As a result, it will greatly lower the temperature of any object it contacts as it evaporates.

Medical use 
For its medical uses, 1,1,1,2-tetrafluoroethane has the generic name norflurane.  It is used as propellant for some metered dose inhalers. It is considered safe for this use. In combination with pentafluoropropane, it is used as a topical vapocoolant spray for numbing boils before curettage. It has also been studied as a potential inhalational anesthetic, but it is nonanaesthetic at doses used in inhalers.

See also 
 List of refrigerants
 Tetrabromoethane
 Tetrachloroethane

References

External links 

 
 European Fluorocarbons Technical Committee (EFCTC)
 MSDS at Oxford University
 Concise International Chemical Assessment Document 11, at inchem.org
 Pressure temperature calculator
 
 R134a 2 phase computer cooling 

Fluoroalkanes
Refrigerants
Automotive chemicals
Propellants
Airsoft
Excipients
Greenhouse gases
GABAA receptor positive allosteric modulators
General anesthetics